Tony Runs Wild is a 1926 American silent Western film directed by Tom Buckingham and starring Tom Mix, Tony the Horse, Jacqueline Logan, Lawford Davidson, Duke R. Lee, and Vivien Oakland. The film was released by Fox Film Corporation on April 18, 1926.

Cast
 Tom Mix as Tom Trent
 Tony the Horse as Tony – the Wild Horse Leader
 Jacqueline Logan as Grace Percival
 Lawford Davidson as Slade
 Duke R. Lee as Bender (credited as Duke Lee)
 Vivien Oakland as Mrs. Johnson (credited as Vivian Oakland)
 Marion Harlan as Ethel Johnson
 Edward Martindel as Mr. Johnson
 Raymond Wells as Sheriff
 Dick Carter as Ranch Foreman (credited as Richard Carter)
 Arthur Morrison as Auto Stage Driver
 Lucien Littlefield as Red
 Jack Padjan as Deputy Sheriff (uncredited)

Preservation
A copy of Tony Runs Wild survives in Czech Film Archive.

References

External links
 
 

1926 films
1926 Western (genre) films
American black-and-white films
Films directed by Tom Buckingham
Fox Film films
Silent American Western (genre) films
1920s English-language films
1920s American films